KQNY (91.9 FM) is a community radio licensed to serve Quincy, California. The station is owned by Plumas Community Radio and airs a variety format.

The station was assigned the KQNY call letters by the Federal Communications Commission on October 17, 2008.

References

External links
 Official Website
 

QNY
Radio stations established in 2010
2010 establishments in California
Variety radio stations in the United States
Community radio stations in the United States
Plumas County, California